In Secret (foaled 2 September 2019) is a multiple Group 1 winning Australian Thoroughbred racehorse.

Background 

In Secret was bred by Longwood Thoroughbred Farm and Segenhoe Stud and consigned for sale at the 2021 Magic Millions sale.  She was the only horse purchased at these sales by  Godolphin for $900,000.    In Secret's broodmare, Eloping, won over $1 million dollars in her racing career, culminating with Group 3 victories in the Keith Mackay Handicap and Champagne Stakes.

Racing career
In Secret had her first race start at Scone Racecourse on the 14 May 2022 in the Woodlands Stakes.  She won the race comfortably when ridden by Hugh Bowman, who stated after the race, "She has got a bit of a class edge on this lot, and she is certainly up to better things."

After running second at her next start in the Silver Slipper Stakes, In Secret next contested The Run To The Rose which she won by 1.5 lengths.  In Secret then ran second in the Golden Rose Stakes before winning the Group 1 Coolmore Stud Stakes at Flemington Racecourse when ridden by James McDonald.

Pedigree

References 

Racehorses bred in Australia
Racehorses trained in Australia
2019 racehorse births